Thomas Murray (January 18, 1836 – July 29, 1915) was a businessman and political figure in the Ottawa Valley. He represented Renfrew North in the Legislative Assembly of Ontario from 1870 to 1871, from 1879 to 1882 and from 1883 to 1890 and Pontiac in the House of Commons of Canada as a Liberal member in 1891 and 1892 and from 1900 to 1904.

He was born in Goulbourn Township in 1836, the son of James Murray, an Irish immigrant, and Elizabeth Burrows. He was a merchant in Ottawa and then Pembroke, trading in lumber and furs. He served on the town council for Pembroke and also served as reeve. He was elected to the 1st Parliament of Ontario after the death of John Supple; he was defeated in the election that followed in 1871 but elected again in 1879. He resigned his seat in the provincial parliament in 1882 to run unsuccessfully for a seat in the federal parliament; he was reelected in 1883. His younger brother William represented Renfrew North in the House of Commons. In 1884, Thomas and William registered a claim on a nickel deposit near Sudbury which became the Murray Mine, the first nickel mine established in the area.

Murray was married twice: to Jane Copeland in 1855 and to Emma Alice Foran in 1901. He died in Pembroke at the age of 79.

Electoral record

References

External links

1836 births
1915 deaths
Canadian people of Ulster-Scottish descent
History of Greater Sudbury
Liberal Party of Canada MPs
Mayors of places in Ontario
Members of the House of Commons of Canada from Quebec
Ontario Liberal Party MPPs
People from Pembroke, Ontario